Amodara is large village of Bayad taluka in Aravalli district. Amodara's population around more than 10000 people. In Amodara village predominant population is of the Solanki Rajput who's are came from Kalari  and also some other community. Most of the population of village are farmers. In this village has a basic facility like Primary School, Higher Secondary School, Gram Panchayat, dairy and also 4G internet services.

Places

Most Visited Places

Gopnath Mahadev 
Khodiyar Temple
Bahuchar Temple (Amodara)

Places
Gopnath Mahadev is a Siva's Temple. This Temple is more than 100 years old. Savan month many crowds are coming in lord Siva's temple

Ma Khodiyar Temple (locating Juna Shedha). Many crowd are coming in Khodiyar Jayanti and  Khodiyar Maa's Rath journey to all around Amodara.

References

Aravalli district
Villages in Aravalli district